Fedayi may refer to:

 Armenian fedayi, Armenian civilians who formed self-defense units and armed bands in reaction to the mass murder of Armenians in late 19th and early 20th centuries
 Fedayeen (Arabic for "those who sacrifice themselves"), a term used to refer to various military groups